A number of Suborbital spaceflights were conducted during 2009, consisting of sounding rocket missions and missile tests. Between the start of the year and 1 March, at least nine publicly announced suborbital spaceflights were conducted, the first of which occurred on 26 January.

January

Delta-2
Delta-2 was a Japanese auroral and upper atmospheric research mission, conducted using an S-310 sounding rocket. It was launched from Area U3 at the Andøya Rocket Range. The launch occurred at 00:15 GMT on 26 January, making it the first recorded spaceflight launch of 2009. The mission was conducted by Andøya for JAXA and Nagoya University.

ACES
ACES consisted of two Black Brant rockets, launched from Poker Flat on 29 January. The rockets carried an Auroral research payload for the University of Iowa. ACES-I, using a Black Brant IX, was launched at 09:49 GMT, and ACES-II, which used a Black Brant VB, followed 90 seconds later.

February

Trident II tests
This was one of two Trident II launches conducted in February, however the date of the other test was not released.

Turbopause
Turbopause was a series of spaceflights conducted by Clemson University to research the upper atmosphere. Four Terrier-Orion rockets were launched from Poker Flat on 18 February, at 09:52, 10:29, 10:59 and 11:47 GMT.  The rockets released trimethyl aluminium vapours into the upper atmosphere to study turbulence at high altitudes.

CIBER
CIBER was an infrared astronomy mission launched from White Sands at 10:45 on 25 February. A Black Brant IX sounding rocket was used. The payload was operated by the California Institute of Technology, and the flight was reported to have been successful.

See also
2009 in spaceflight

References

2009